Bertil Robert Carlsson (18 March 1901 – 23 February 1959) was a Swedish weightlifter. He competed in the light-heavyweight division at the 1924 Summer Olympics and finished 13th.

References

1901 births
1959 deaths
Olympic weightlifters of Sweden
Weightlifters at the 1924 Summer Olympics
Sportspeople from Örebro
20th-century Swedish people